Stuart Beedie (born 16 August 1960 in Aberdeen) is a Scottish former football player, who played as a midfielder for a number of Scottish clubs, including St Johnstone, Dundee United, Hibernian, Dunfermline and Dundee. Beedie won a Scottish Cup runners-up medal with Dundee United, scoring United's goal in a 2–1 defeat to Celtic in the 1985 Scottish Cup Final.

Beedie was a "very solid" midfielder, who played a significant role in an infamous incident between Hibernian and Rangers at the start of the 1986–87 season. Graeme Souness was making his first appearance in Scottish football as player-manager of Rangers in a match at Easter Road, but he was sent off for an "assault" on Hibs player George McCluskey. That incident had been sparked by Beedie making a strong challenge on Souness. Beedie also scored a goal in that match, in which Hibs secured a famous 2–1 win.

After retiring from playing in 1995, Beedie moved to Australia, where he was assistant manager at Wollongong Wolves. Beedie remained in the country and managed Illawarra side Dapto.

Honours
Scottish Cup Runner-up: 1
 1984–85

References

External links 
 

1960 births
Living people
Footballers from Aberdeen
Association football midfielders
Scottish footballers
Montrose F.C. players
St Johnstone F.C. players
Dundee United F.C. players
Hibernian F.C. players
Dunfermline Athletic F.C. players
Dundee F.C. players
East Fife F.C. players
Scottish Football League players
Wollongong United FC players